Jolene is the thirteenth solo studio album by American entertainer Dolly Parton. It was released on February 4, 1974, by RCA Victor.
The title track, "Jolene", tells the tale of a housewife confronting a beautiful seductress who she believes is having an affair with her husband. It became Parton's second solo number-one country single; it also was a moderate pop hit for her, and also did well in the United Kingdom. Since the introduction of downloads to the Official Chart in 2005, it has amassed 255,300 downloads and 6.68 million streams. It has been covered by numerous performers.

The album was released around the time Parton was embarking on a solo career, after having spent seven years as part of Porter Wagoner's weekly TV series and road show, and one of the album's songs, "I Will Always Love You", was reportedly written to express the remorse Parton felt over the professional breakup. Released as the album's second single, it also became a number-one country single.

"Early Morning Breeze" is a re-recording of a song which previously appeared on 1971's Coat of Many Colors. "Lonely Coming Down" had first appeared on Parton's Wagoner tribute album, My Favorite Songwriter, Porter Wagoner, from 1972.

Another re-issue was released in conjunction with Dolly's 2007 European Tour along with two other older out-of-print albums. This re-issue included additional previously unreleased songs.

In 2010, Sony Music reissued the 2007 CD Jolene in a triple-feature CD set with Coat of Many Colors and My Tennessee Mountain Home and they have never been out of print.

Critical reception
A positive review of the album by Billboard said, "With the title taken from her latest hit single, Dolly goes about recording a whole bunch of others—hits, that is. There are perhaps five or six here which could stand on their own, including the exceptional ballad, 'Lonely Coming Down'. Most of the writing is her own, as usual, and that's always a plus."

Track listing

Personnel
Dolly Parton – vocals, guitar
Jimmy Colvard – guitar
Dave Kirby – guitar
Bobby Thompson – guitar
Chip Young – guitar
Pete Drake – pedal steel guitar
Stu Basore – pedal steel guitar
Bobby Dyson – bass
Jerry Carrigan – drums
Larrie Londin – drums
Kenny Malone – drums
Buck Trent – banjo
Mack Magaha – fiddle
Johnny Gimble – fiddle
Hargus "Pig" Robbins – piano
David Briggs – piano
Onie Wheeler – harmonica
The Nashville Edition - background vocals

Chart positions
Album

Album (Year-End)

Certifications

References

External links
Jolene at Dolly Parton On-Line

Dolly Parton albums
1974 albums
Albums produced by Bob Ferguson (music)
RCA Records albums